Cheft Sar (also known as Chefteh Sar) is a village in Rudpey-ye Jonubi Rural District, in the Central District of Sari County, Mazandaran Province, Iran. At the 2006 census, its population was 149, in 37 families.

References 

 Populated places in Sari County